False Colours is a Regency romance novel by Georgette Heyer. Set in 1817, it concerns a young man temporarily impersonating his missing twin brother.

Plot summary

Kit Fancot returns home to England from diplomatic service in Vienna to find that his twin brother Evelyn has disappeared. Although this would not normally be a problem, Evelyn is supposed to meet the autocratic grandmother of the lady to whom he has proposed. Kit is obliged to impersonate his brother to save the betrothal.

When Evelyn doesn't reappear, Kit has to stay in the rôle of Evelyn indefinitely and decides to retire to his family home in the countryside. Evelyn's chosen lady, Cressy, comes with her grandmother to the Fancot family home however. By careful deduction Cressy is able to work out that Evelyn is actually Kit in disguise, but as they have fallen in love with each other, she helps him with the deception.

Eventually Evelyn comes home with a tale of what happened to him. He discloses that he met the lady of his dreams and Kit thinks up of a fantastical idea to make sure that both brothers can get what they wish without any scandal.

References

1963 British novels
Novels by Georgette Heyer
Historical novels
Fiction set in 1817
The Bodley Head books
Twins in fiction
Regency romance novels
British romance novels